Portuguese Tangier covers the period of Portuguese rule over Tangier, today a city in Morocco. The territory was ruled by the Kingdom of Portugal from 1471–1661.

History 

After the Portuguese started their expansion by taking Ceuta in retribution for its piracy in 1415, Tangier became a major goal. Portugal attempted to capture Tangier in 1437, 1458, and 1464 but only succeeded in 28 August 1471 after its population abandoned the city following the Portuguese Conquest of Asilah. 

From Asilah King Afonso V dispatched the Marquis of Montemor Dom João ahead of a large detachment of troops to take possession of Tangier, and nominated as its first captain the Rodrigo Afonso de Melo, who took office with a garrison after the Marquis had left with the remainder of his troops. The original garrison of Tangier in 1471 numbered 40 horsemen; 470 infantry, of which 130 were crossbowmen; 10 gunners, 6 scouts. 

Tangier was considered too large for the Portuguese to adequately defend, hence King Afonso V ordered that three quarters of the city be demolished and the walls restricted to the remaining part. 

As in Ceuta, they converted its main mosque into the town's cathedral; it was further embellished by several restoration works. In addition to the cathedral, the Portuguese raised European-style houses and Franciscan and Dominican chapels and monasteries.

Siege of Tangier, 1501
In 1501, the Sultan of Fez assembled an army of 12000 men to attack Tangier. The captain of Tangier Dom Rodrigo de Castro was warned of the impending attack shortly before the army of Fez reached the vicinity of the by a messenger dog that had arrived from Portuguese Asilah with a message hung around its neck. Dom Rodrigo readied the garrison, made a sally to cover the retreat of the farmers and the cattle still outside the walls, and after being wounded in the face and losing 9 men including his son, he withdrew behind the city walls. After fighting at the gate, the Sultan withdrew with his army four days later to attack Asilah instead.

Later history

The Wattasids assaulted Tangier in 1508, 1511, and 1515 but without success.

In 1508, future Portuguese governor of India Duarte de Menezes succeeded his father as captain of Tangier, a function he had already been effectively performing in his father's name since 1507. He carved a formidable reputation as a military leader in numerous engagements around Tangier.

The Sultan of Fez Abu Abd Allah al-Burtuqali Muhammad ibn Muhammad laid siege to Tangier in 1511. He succeeded in tearing down part of a bulwark and breach the defensive perimeter, however they were forced back by a force under the command of Dom Duarte de Meneses. Having attempted to storm the city again the following day, the Moroccans were once more prevented from advanving in urban combat, and the Sultan lifted the siege shortly afterwards.  

In April 4 1512, the qaid of Chefchaouen Ali Ibn Rashid al-Alam (Barraxa in Portuguese) and the qaid of Tetouan Cid Almandri II (Almandarim in Portuguese) devastated the region and villages around Tangier with 800 horse, however they were engaged by 200 horse and 200 foot of the garrison of Tangier under the command of Duarte de Meneses and routed, the Portuguese having captured plentiful spoil."

An incident took place in Tangier on the night of September 16 1533: after Dom Álvaro de Abranches had handed the captaincy to Gonçalo Mendes Sacoto and was preparing to embark back to Portugal, two Moroccans managed to scale the wall with a ladder undetected by the Traição gate, and though an alarm was eventually sounded, they wounded the son of Dom Álvaro Dom Jorge with a spear, Domingues Gonçalves with two stabbings and made off with an African they captured. 

In 1532, King John III had already expressed to the Pope his intention of withdrawing from some fortresses in Morocco, however when he requested the opinions of the grandees of Portugal on the matter in 1534, he declared his wish to maintain Tangier. The Portuguese Cortes that held session between 1562 and 1563 after the Great Siege of Mazagan insisted that the king maintain Tangier and strenghten its garrison.

King Sebastian entered Tangier on July 6th 1578 with a fleet of 50 warships and 900 transports bearing an army of over 15000 men, and while there was met by the former Sultan of Morocco Abu Abdallah Mohammed II Saadi, who had appealed to Sebastian for help recovering his throne after having been deposed by his uncle Abu Marwan Abd al-Malik I Saadi. Sebastian then moved his army to Asilah, and from there marched out for the fatal Battle of Alcácer Quibir, where the Portuguese were routed but all three monarchs perished in the action. 

The tenure of Jorge de Mendonça, the last captain of Tangier nominated by the Portuguese Crown before the Iberian Union was marked by hardships in the city. The garrison had lost most of its horsemen and veteran soldiers in the Battle of Alcácer-Quibir, and there was a lack of food, which caused many to die of starvation, while poor weather prevented his successor from reaching the city with reinforcements for months.

In 1580, it passed with the rest of Portugal's domains into Habsburg control as part of the Iberian Union but maintained its strictly Portuguese garrison and administration.

In 1661, Tangier was given to England as dowry of Charles II of England when he married Catherine of Braganza, along with the island of Bombay and 800,000 pounds sterling.

Portuguese captains of Tangier
28 August 1471 to 1484? -Rodrigo Afonso de Melo, 1st Count of Olivença
1484? to 1486 - Manuel de Melo, Count of Olivença
1486 to 1489 - João de Meneses, 1st Count of Tarouca 1st Term
1487 to 1489 - Fernão Martins Mascarenhas, Interim 
1489 to 1490 - Manuel Pessanha, Interim 
1490? to 1501 - Lopo Vaz de Azevedo
1501 to 1501 - Dom Rodrigo de Castro
1501 to 1508 - João de Meneses, 1st Count of Tarouca, 2nd Term
1508 to 1521 - Duarte de Meneses, 1st Term 
1521 to 1522 - Henrique de Meneses
1522 to 1532 - Duarte de Meneses d'Évora
1532 to 16 September 1533 - Dom Álvaro de Abranches.
16 September 1533 to 1536 - Gonçalo Mendes Sacoto
1536 to 1539 - Duarte de Meneses, 2nd Term
1539 to 1546 - João de Meneses
1546 to 1548 - Francisco Botelho
1548 to 1550 - Pedro de Meneses
1550 to 1552 - João Álvares de Azevedo
1552 to 1553 - Luís de Loureiro
1553 - Fernando de Menezes
1553 to 29 April 1554 - Luís da Silva de Meneses
29 April 1554 - 4 May 1554 - Pedro Garcia
4 May 1554 - 9 May 1554 Pedro Álvares Correia
9 May 1554 - Diogo Lopes de Franca
1554 to 1564 - Bernardim de Carvalho
1564 to 1566 - Lourenço de Távora
15 July 1566 to 1 August 1572 - João de Meneses
1572 to 1573 - Rui de Carvalho
1573 to 1574 - Diogo Lopes da Franca
1574 to 15 August 1574 - António of Portugal
1574 to 1578 - Duarte de Meneses, Viceroy of Portuguese India
1578 to September 1578 - Pedro da Silva
7 September 1578 to 25 July 1581 - Jorge de Mendonça
25 July 1581 to 1590 - Francisco de Almeida
1590 to 17 June 1591 - Belchior da França and Simão Lopes de Mendonça
17 June 1591 to 24 August 1599 - Aires de Saldanha 
24 August 1599 to 22 September 1605 - António Pereira Lopes de Berredo
22 September 1605 to March 1610 - Nuno de Mendonça
March 1610 to June 1614 - Afonso de Noronha
June 1614 to October 1614 - Luís de Meneses, 2nd Count of Tarouca
October 1614 to August 1615 - Luís de Noronha
August 1615 to 22 December 1616 - João Coutinho, 5th Count of Redondo
22 December 1616 to 1 July 1617 - André Dias da França
1 July 1617 to 1621 - Pedro Manuel
1621 to 13 March 1622 - André Dias da França
13 March 1622 to July 1624 - Jorge de Mascarenhas, Marquis of Montalvão
July 1624 to 14 May 1628 - Miguel de Noronha, 4th Count of Linhares
14 May 1628 to 18 June 1628 - Galaaz Fernandes da Silveira
18 June 1628 to 1637 - Fernando de Mascarenhas, Count of Torre
15 April 1637 to 24 August 1643 - Rodrigo Lobo da Silveira
1643 to 16 April 1645 - André Dias da França
16 April 1645 to 20 November 1649 - Caetano Coutinho
20 November 1649 to January 1653 - Luís Lobo, Baron of Alvito
January 1653 to 7 March 1656 - Rodrigo de Lencastre
7 March 1656 to 1661 - Fernando de Meneses, 2nd Count of Ericeira
1661 to 29 January 1662 - Luís de Almeida, 1st Count of Avintes

See also
Portuguese Asilah
Great Siege of Mazagan
List of governors of Tangier

References

Source 
 . URL is only preview.
 .
 .

Portuguese colonisation in Africa
Sieges involving Portugal
16th century in Morocco
History of Tangier
Battles involving Morocco